At the Edge of Time is the ninth studio album by the German power metal band Blind Guardian. A two-CD version of the album was released, with the second disc containing eight tracks. The artwork for the album was created by Colombian artist Felipe Machado Franco. The album was released in Europe on 30 July 2010. A music video for "A Voice in the Dark" was released on 3 August 2010.

Track listing

Reception 

The album was named as "Album of the Month" in the August 2010 issue of Germany's Metal Hammer magazine.

At the Edge of Time was the first album in the band's history to climb to second place in the German Media Control Charts. It kept its place among the Top 10 for three straight weeks.

The album was particularly successful in the United States. Not only did it debut in the 108th position of the Billboard Top 200 chart but also became the No. 1 song on the Billboard Heatseekers chart. This marks the highest position that a Blind Guardian album had reached until then in the United States.

The album debuted at No. 18 on the Top Hard Music Albums chart and No. 108 on the Top 200 chart in Canada.

Song information 
 Sacred Worlds
An edited version of the original song "Sacred", which has a new orchestral intro and outro. It was written by Blind Guardian for the 2008 video game Sacred 2: Fallen Angel.

 Tanelorn (Into the Void)
Based on Michael Moorcock's The Eternal Champion series.

 Road of No Release
Based on Peter S. Beagle's The Innkeeper's Song.

 Ride into Obsession
Based on Robert Jordan's The Wheel of Time series.
(Hansi Kürsch: "An introduction to the main characters, the Dragon Reborn and the Dark Lord Ba'alzamon.")

 Curse My Name
Based on The Tenure of Kings and Magistrates, a political writing by John Milton where he legitimizes the killing of a king who didn't carry out his duties.

 Valkyries
Inspired by Norse mythology, especially Valkyries, as well as the perception of time.

 Control the Divine
Based on John Milton's Paradise Lost.

 War of the Thrones
Based on George R. R. Martin's A Song of Ice and Fire series.

 A Voice in the Dark
Based on George R. R. Martin's A Song of Ice and Fire series. It tells the story of Bran Stark, a key character in the series. This track was the first single from the album, and it is a small comeback to the band's original speed metal style.

 Wheel of Time
Based on Robert Jordan's The Wheel of Time series, focusing on (and through the viewpoint of) Rand al'Thor, the protagonist of the series.

Personnel
Blind Guardian
Hansi Kürsch – vocals
André Olbrich – lead, rhythm and acoustic guitars
Marcus Siepen – rhythm guitar
Frederik Ehmke – drums, percussion, flute and bagpipes
Guest musicians
Oliver Holzwarth – bass guitar
 Additional personnel
Felipe Machado Franco – cover artwork

Charts

Release history

References

External links
 Samples of all tracks at Blind Guardian's website

2010 albums
Blind Guardian albums
Nuclear Blast albums
Albums produced by Charlie Bauerfeind